The Women's 30 kilometre classical event of the FIS Nordic World Ski Championships 2015 was held on 28 February 2015.

Results
The race was started at 13:00.

References

Women's 30 kilometre classical
2015 in Swedish women's sport